The Central Institutional Organization Commission, sometimes synonymous with the State Commission for Public Sector Reform, is an agency of the Central Committee of the Chinese Communist Party with full jurisdiction also over the State Council of the People's Republic of China as well as lower and local government bodies. It is led by the Premier of the State Council and closely tied to the Organization Department of the Chinese Communist Party.

The commission's functions include making policy on administrative reform, central reorganization plans, personnel establishment, quotas, wages, and administrative regulations for State institutions. Its authority was enhanced after the Ministry of Personnel was abolished. There is also the State Commission Office for Public Sector Reform, which serves as its executive organ.

During its history, the Commission changed name several times between the establishment of the People's Republic of China and the adoption of its current name and functions in 1991.

Membership 
Current membership:

 Director
 Li Keqiang, Premier of the State Council, Politburo Standing Committee member

 Deputy Director
 Wang Huning, Politburo Standing Committee member, First-ranked Secretary of the Central Secretariat

 Members
 Not yet publicly released

See also 

State Council of the People's Republic of China
Organization Department of the Chinese Communist Party

References 

Institutions of the Central Committee of the Chinese Communist Party
Public sector in China
1991 establishments in China